The Southern Pacific Building is one of three office buildings comprising One Market Plaza along the Embarcadero in San Francisco, California. The historic 11-story,  building, also known as "The Landmark", was started in 1916 and completed in 1917.

History
The building served as the headquarters for the Southern Pacific Railroad after its move from the Flood Building in 1917, ten years after SP had moved into the Flood Building in 1907. At its completion, the building's first floor was devoted to retail except for the portion facing the rear courtyard (opening to Mission Street), which was reserved for Southern Pacific. SP rented the second floor to a tenant, but occupied floors three through ten with various offices. For many years, the building was topped with a large sign emblazoned with a gothic "S·P".

It was later incorporated into the 1976 One Market Plaza development which includes Spear Tower and Steuart Tower. By 1995, Sam Zell owned One Market Plaza. TMG invested another $50 million to renovate the property, including a seismic retrofit, completing work in 1999. Equity Office Properties Trust sold One Market Street to The Blackstone Group in February 2007, and Blackstone, in turn, sold One Market to Morgan Stanley in June 2007 as part of a large real estate acquisition. Morgan Stanley sold approximately half of One Market Plaza to The Paramount Group in July 2007.

Design
When completed, One Market Street was hailed as the tallest steel-framed structure west of the Mississippi. It is designed in the Italian Renaissance style with details executed in Roman brick and terra cotta. The lobby was fitted with Colorado yule marble walls and an ornamental plaster ceiling.

During the 1998–99 refurbishment, two of the eight original passenger elevators were eliminated and custom-sized modern elevator cabs were installed in the other six shafts, running on the original guide rails. The elevators had received a major redesign in 1956, when elevator operators were eliminated by automatic operation.

Gallery

Former Tenants
Southern Pacific
Del Monte Foods
Salesforce.com

Current Tenants
Autodesk
Google

See also

 San Francisco's tallest buildings

References

 

Office buildings completed in 1917
Landmarks in San Francisco
Market Street (San Francisco)
Skyscraper office buildings in San Francisco
Bliss and Faville buildings
Southern Pacific Railroad